Sangean Electronics, Inc. is a Taiwanese electronics company headquartered in Zhonghe District, New Taipei, Taiwan, with a factory located in Dongguan, China. The organisation is globally active with business units in Venlo, Netherlands, for Europe and Santa Fe Springs, California, for the Americas. The business units are directly in contact with distributors in relevant areas. It is noted for its shortwave radio receivers and digital radio (HD and DAB) receivers.

Products 
Sangean produces DAB / DAB plus (DAB+) radios, HD Radio tuner radios (with international tuning support), internet radios, work site radios, shower radios, portable radios and handheld radios.

The brand is distinctive for its designed products. Several products have won awards, which include  and the Taiwan Symbol of Excellence.

Products
Apart from products sold under its own brand names, which include Lextronix, Sangean also produces on behalf of other companies: Many of the shortwave radios marketed by Siemens, Panasonic, Braun, Grundig, C.Crane, and Roberts have been and are being developed and produced by Sangean.

The UNDOK app

Most of the internet radios Sangean produces are compatible with the UNDOK app. The app can be used to connect a mobile device to the radio and select an input (DAB, FM, Bluetooth) or radio station.

See also

 List of electronics companies
 List of companies of Taiwan

Sources

External links

Sangean Official Website
Sangean Facebook
Sangean Instagram
Sangean Youtube
Sangean Europe
Sangean Australia

1974 establishments in Taiwan
Electronics companies established in 1974
Digital radio
Electronics companies of Taiwan
Manufacturing companies based in New Taipei
Taiwanese brands
Zhonghe District
Radio manufacturers